Allen's Grove (alternatively spelled Allens Grove, Allen Grove, or Allengrove) is an unincorporated community and census-designated place in Walworth County, Wisconsin, United States. It was first named a CDP at the 2020 census, which showed a population of 174.

History
Philip Allen, a Revolutionary War veteran, and his children: Philip Jr., Harvey, Sidney, Pliny, Asa Keyes, and Persis, came from New York in May 1845, to settle in Allen Grove. Sixty-five Allens traveled by canal boat, steamboat, and overland from Kenosha bringing with them material to build four houses, carpenters to build them, a minister, Bibles, and hymnals. The Allens organized the Congregational church here in 1845. They established a preparatory school for Beloit College in 1856. Philip Junior became the first postmaster in 1846. Philip Allen Sr. is buried in Mt. Philip Cemetery, west of here.

Demographics

References

Unincorporated communities in Wisconsin
Unincorporated communities in Walworth County, Wisconsin
Census-designated places in Wisconsin
Census-designated places in Walworth County, Wisconsin